Alix Balmir is a Haitian diplomat  He has been   ambassador to Venezuela and to Colombia, and is currently ambassador to Panama. His youngest daughter, Stéphanie Balmir Villedrouin, was a minister within President Michel Martelly’s cabinet.

References

Living people
Date of birth missing (living people)
Place of birth missing (living people)
Haitian diplomats
Haitian people of Mulatto descent
Year of birth missing (living people)